Pycnothelidae is a family of mygalomorph spiders first described in 1917. It was downgraded to a subfamily of the funnel-web trapdoor spiders in 1985, but returned to family status in 2020.

Genera
, the World Spider Catalog accepted the following genera:

Acanthogonatus Karsch, 1880 – South America
Bayana Pérez-Miles, Costa & Montes de Oca, 2014
Pionothele Purcell, 1902 – South Africa, Namibia
Pycnothele Chamberlin, 1917 – Uruguay, Brazil, Argentina
Stanwellia Rainbow & Pulleine, 1918 – Australia, New Zealand
Stenoterommata Holmberg, 1881 – Brazil, Uruguay, Argentina

References

 
Mygalomorphae families